Katarína Berešová-Pejpková (born 10 October 1987) is a Slovak long-distance runner. She competed in the marathon at the 2012 Summer Olympics, placing 99th with a time of 2:48:11. Later, she competed in the marathon at the 2016 Summer Olympics, standing 107th with a time of 2:50:54.

References

External links 

 
 Katarína Berešová at the Slovenský Olympijský Výbor 

1987 births
Living people
Slovak female long-distance runners
Olympic athletes of Slovakia
Athletes (track and field) at the 2012 Summer Olympics
Athletes (track and field) at the 2016 Summer Olympics
Sportspeople from Trebišov
World Athletics Championships athletes for Slovakia
European Games silver medalists for Slovakia
Athletes (track and field) at the 2015 European Games
European Games medalists in athletics